Gaspar Alberto Rivas Sánchez (born 17 May 1978) is a Chilean lawyer and politician. Since March 2022, he has been a deputy of the Republic representing District 6 of the Valparaíso Region, for the legislative period 2022-2026.

He was a member of the National Renewal party between 2005 and 2014, and between 2010 and 2018 he was a deputy for the old district No. 11 of the Valparaíso Region.

Between 2018 and 2019, he was part of the neo-nazi group Social Patriot Movement, which he led from May to October 18, 2019.

Lastly, during 2021 and 2023 he was member of the Party of the People, until he was expelled in February 2023.

Early & personal life 
He is the son of Gaspar Rivas Schulz and Virginia Sánchez Zañartu. He completed his basic and secondary education at the Chacabuco Institute in his hometown. He then studied at the Faculty of Law of the University of Chile, where he graduated as a lawyer in 2005.

In 2014 he made public his sentimental relationship with the Ukrainian cyclist Elena Novikova, whom he met through the social network Facebook. Later, the deputy would have traveled to Kiev to meet the cyclist, after which he returned with her to Chile. This relationship ultimately did not prosper, with the cyclist returning to her country of origin, assuring Rivas that they were still friends.

Political career 
In 2009 he was elected as deputy for the 11th district. In 2012, he resigned from the National Renovation party, due to his disagreements with the board chaired by Carlos Larraín. However, he returned to the party a few months later, and in June 2013 was ratified as the party's candidate for the parliamentary elections that year.

In 2018, he joined the Social Patriot Movement, a neo-nazi organization notable for its opposition to LGBT rights and globalism. He was the president of the organization from May to October 2019.

In mid-2021, Rivas contacted presidential candidate Franco Parisi by telephone to discuss the possibility of competing on the parliamentary list of the Party of the People. In August of that year, he presented his candidacy for the Chamber of Deputies. of Deputies and Deputies by the District 6 in representation of the party. He was elected in the parliamentary elections with 14,851 votes and assumed office on March 11, 2022.

Controversies 
In April 2016, during a session of the Chamber of Deputies, Rivas referred to businessman Andrónico Lukšić Craig as "a criminal" and "a son of a bitch". Lukšić responded to the parliamentarian through a video on YouTube, where he summoned him to deliver the records he had against him to the courts, and analyzed the possibility of initiating legal action for said insults. Rivas did not retract his statements, for which Lukšić sued for insults against the deputy in May of that year, and in July the Court of Appeals of Santiago confirmed Rivas's immunity to face trial. On December 19 of the same year, the oral trial for the case began in the Justice Center of Santiago, occasion in which Lukšić was rebuked and attacked by protesters. On December 28 of that year, a sentence was issued, sentencing Rivas to 180 days of probation, and the payment of a fine of 40 UTM (equivalent to about  2,400,000 CLP to 2.500 USD), which disabled it or to exercise their parliamentary office.

References

External links
 

1978 births
Living people
Chilean historians
21st-century Chilean politicians
Neo-Nazism in Chile
Neo-Nazi politicians
National Renewal (Chile) politicians
Party of the People (Chile) politicians
University of Chile alumni